Robert Andrew Witt Jr. (born June 14, 2000) is an American professional baseball shortstop and third baseman for the Kansas City Royals of Major League Baseball (MLB). He was selected second overall by the Royals in the 2019 Major League Baseball draft.

Amateur career
Witt attended Colleyville Heritage High School in Colleyville, Texas. He committed to play college baseball at the University of Oklahoma. As a junior in 2018, he batted .446 with ten home runs. That summer, he won the High School Home Run Derby at Nationals Park. Later in the summer, he also played in the Under Armour All-America Baseball Game at Wrigley Field where he hit a home run and was named team MVP as well as the Perfect Game All-American Classic at Petco Park. In December, he played for Team USA in Panama City during the 2018 COPABE Pan-American Championships, helping Team USA win a gold medal. In 2019, his senior year, he was named the Gatorade National Baseball Player of the Year after batting .515 with 15 home runs, 54 RBIs, and 17 stolen bases.

Professional career

Minor leagues
Witt was considered one of the top prospects for the 2019 Major League Baseball draft. He was selected by the Kansas City Royals with the second overall pick. He signed for $7.79 million and made his professional debut with the Rookie-level Arizona League Royals. Over 37 games, he batted .262/.317/.354 with one home run, 27 RBIs, and nine stolen bases in 10 attempts.

Witt did not play a minor league game in 2020 due to the cancellation of the minor league season caused by the COVID-19 pandemic. To begin the 2021 season, he was assigned to the Northwest Arkansas Naturals of the Double-A Central. In June, he was selected to play in the All-Star Futures Game at Coors Field. After batting .292/.369/.570 with 16 home runs, fifty RBIs, and 14 stolen bases over sixty games, he was promoted to the Omaha Storm Chasers of the Triple-A East. Over 62 games with Omaha, Witt slashed .285/.352/.581 with 17 home runs, 46 RBIs, and 15 stolen bases. He was awarded both the USA Today Minor League Player of the Year Award and the Baseball America Minor League Player of the Year Award.

Kansas City Royals
Witt began practicing at third base during 2022 spring training. On April 5, 2022, the Royals announced that Witt had made the Opening Day roster. He made his MLB debut on Opening Day on April 7 as the Royals' starting third baseman. Witt hit his first major league home run on May 3 against the St. Louis Cardinals. In a game against the Detroit Tigers on September 3, he hit his 20th home run of the season, making him the fifth player in MLB history to join the 20-20 club in their first season.

In 2022 he batted .254/.294/.428 in 591 at bats, with 82 runs, 6 triples (4th in the AL), 20 home runs, 80 RBIs, and 30 steals (4th) in 37 attempts, and was the 10th-youngest player in the AL. He had the fastest sprint speed in the majors, at 30.4 feet per second.

Personal life
Witt's father, Bobby Witt, played parts of 16 seasons as a pitcher in MLB, and Bobby Sr.'s brother (and Bobby Jr.'s uncle), Mike, also pitched in MLB for 12 seasons. Bobby Sr. is a player agent with Octagon Baseball and is his son's advisor.

References

External links

Personal website

2000 births
Living people
People from Colleyville, Texas
Baseball players from Texas
Major League Baseball shortstops
Major League Baseball third basemen
Kansas City Royals players
Arizona League Royals players
Northwest Arkansas Naturals players
Omaha Storm Chasers players
United States national baseball team players
Colleyville Heritage High School alumni
2023 World Baseball Classic players